Mummy Pond is a pond between Suess and Lacroix Glaciers in Taylor Valley, Victoria Land. So named by T.L. Pewe, U.S. geologist who visited the area in December 1957, because of the mummified seals found around the pond.

Further reading
 Gunter Faure, Teresa M. Mensing, The Transantarctic Mountains: Rocks, Ice, Meteorites and Water, P 715
  Galen Rowell, Poles Apart: Parallel Visions of the Arctic and Antarctic, P 172
  Sara Wheeler, Terra Incognita: Travels in Antarctica
  Lucy Jane Bledsoe, The Big Bang Symphony: A Novel of Antarctica, P 210
  Ana María Alonso-Zarza, Lawrence H. Tanner, editors, Paleoenvironmental Record and Applications of Calcretes and Palustrine Carbonates, P 99

Lakes of Victoria Land
McMurdo Dry Valleys